Jean Blackwell Hutson (born Jean Blackwell; September 7, 1914 – February 4, 1998) was an American librarian, archivist, writer, curator, educator, and later chief of the Schomburg Center for Research in Black Culture. The Schomburg Center dedicated their Research and Reference Division in honor of Hutson.

Early life and education 

Jean Blackwell was born in Summerfield, Florida and moved to Baltimore, Maryland with her mother in 1918. She graduated valedictorian from Frederick Douglass High School in 1929. Blackwell continued her education at the University of Michigan, studying psychiatry, and transferred to Barnard College, where she graduated with an English degree, Bachelor of Arts in 1935. After completing her bachelor's degree, she applied to Enoch Pratt Library Training School, but was not admitted. She brought a lawsuit against Enoch Pratt which she ultimately won, believing that she was denied entrance as an African-American because of her race. Blackwell eventually received her Master's degree in Library Science from Columbia University in 1936. She also acquired her teaching certificate from Columbia University in 1941.

Hutson was married twice, to Andy Razaf from 1939-1947, and John Hutson from 1952-1957. She had a daughter, Jean Frances Hutson.

Career 
Through the social and cultural prejudices against people of color and women, common at the time, Hutson made great gains in her professional career. From 1936 to 1984, she worked at multiple branches of the New York Public Library system, with a brief period as a school librarian at Paul Lawrence Dunbar High School in Baltimore, Maryland. Her most notable professional position was as curator and chief of the Schomburg Center for Research in Black Culture during which time she developed the Schomburg Dictionary Catalog. The collection at the Schomburg Center grew under her guidance to become "a major source for research on Black history and culture".

In the 1940s, during her time at the Schomburg Center for Research in Black Culture, Hutson organized the Schomburg Corporation, a non-profit organization that lobbied for funding for the research center.  Hutson was instrumental in marketing efforts that secured state, federal, and foundation grants for the following decades.  These funds went towards preservation, assessment of the collection, and building a new facility.  Under her charge, the center became well known during the Civil rights and Black Panther movements and in 1980, the new facility, designed by Max Bond was opened to the public.

While she served at the Schomburg Center, Hutson also took on an adjunct professorship at the City College of New York.  At the behest of her friend and former Schomburg page, Joseph Borome, a librarian at Columbia University, Hutson taught courses in Black Studies at the City College from 1962-1971.  She resigned from the role after supporters of Black studies called for a more radical approach.

Hutson's teaching gave way to a personal invitation from Kwame Nkrumah, the President of Ghana, for Hutson to assist with the development and creation of the African Collection at the University of Ghana. She took the opportunity to move to Ghana, where she spent the years of 1964-1965 as Assistant Librarian in charge of Africana.  During this year, Hutson relished living in a place where she was not discriminated against because of her race.  She also found professional success in making the Africana collection inclusive of Africans in Africa and also the African diaspora.

Hutson retired in 1980 but still remained active. She was still actively involved in organizations such as Information Science in the 1980s. She served on the Task Force on Library and Information Services to Cultural Minorities of the National Commission on Libraries. During her retirement she wrote a chapter on the Schomburg Center in Black Bibliophiles and Collectors: Preservers of Black History.

Merits and involvement 
During Hutson's lifetime, she was involved in many different civic, social, professional and cultural organizations. She was a member of Delta Sigma Theta sorority, the NAACP, the American Library Association, the African Studies Association and the Urban League. Throughout her lifetime she received numerous awards. In 1966, Hutson received the Annual Heritage Award of the Association for the Study of Negro Life and History, and in 1974 she received Black Heroes Memorial Award for Outstanding Community Service Commemorating the Lives of Malcolm. Additional awards received are as follows:

 Honorary Doctorate King Memorial College
 1980 The Professional Service Award, Black Librarians Caucus of the American Library Association
 1989 "I Dream A World Exhibit"
 1990 Honored by Barnard College
 1992 Honored by Columbia University
 1992-2007 Residency Program in her name at SUNY Buffalo
 1994 Jean Hutson General Research and Reference Division named in her honor at the Schomburg Center
 1996 Annual Heritage Award of the Association for the Study of Negro Life and History

Death 
On February 4, 1998, Hutson died at Harlem Hospital in New York City at age 83.

References 

1914 births
1998 deaths
Barnard College alumni
Columbia University School of Library Service alumni
University of Michigan alumni
African-American librarians
American librarians
American women librarians
Female archivists
American archivists
New York Public Library people
20th-century African-American women
20th-century African-American people
20th-century American people